Osieczna may refer to the following places in Poland:
Osieczna, a town in Greater Poland Voivodeship (west-central Poland)
Osieczna, Lower Silesian Voivodeship (south-west Poland)
Osieczna, Pomeranian Voivodeship (north Poland)